Greek National Road 55 is a national highway of northern Greece. It connects Xanthi with the Bulgarian border via Echinos. 

55
Roads in Eastern Macedonia and Thrace